Raton Municipal Airport  (Crews Field) is 12 miles southwest of Raton, in Colfax County, New Mexico, United States. The National Plan of Integrated Airport Systems for 2011–2015 called it a general aviation facility.

Continental Airlines served Raton with Douglas DC-3's for about four years starting in 1949-50. Raton was one of several stops on their flights between Denver, Albuquerque and El Paso. Commuter carriers have also served Raton; Trans Central Airlines in 1969/1970 had a similar route to Continental's, S.I. Airways operated commuter flights to Denver and Amarillo in 1973 and 1974, and Territorial Airlines flew to Albuquerque via Las Vegas, NM, in 1990.

Facilities
Raton Municipal Airport covers 1,280 acres (518 ha) at an elevation of 6,352 feet (1,936 m). It has two asphalt runways: 2/20 is 6,328 by 75 feet (1,929 x 23 m) and 7/25 is 4,404 by 75 feet (1,342 x 23 m).

In the year ending April 30, 2010 the airport had 7,900 aircraft operations, average 21 per day: 85% general aviation, 10% military, and 5% air taxi. 20 aircraft were then based at this airport: 90% single-engine, 5% multi-engine, and 5% ultralight.

Accidents and incidents
On January 17, 2018, a Bell UH-1H Iroquois helicopter crashed shortly after take-off from Raton while on a flight to Folsom, New Mexico. Five of the six people on board were killed. The survivor was seriously injured.

References

External links 
 Aerial image as of October 1997 from USGS The National Map
 

Airports in New Mexico
Buildings and structures in Colfax County, New Mexico
Transportation in Colfax County, New Mexico
Raton, New Mexico